Charles Frederick McMillan (27 December 1887 – 11 December 1911) was an Australian rules footballer who played with Fitzroy in the Victorian Football League (VFL).

McMillan died from cancer in Corowa, New South Wales in 1911, aged 23.

Notes

External links 

1887 births
1911 deaths
Australian rules footballers from Victoria (Australia)
Fitzroy Football Club players
Rutherglen Football Club players
Deaths from cancer in New South Wales